Republic Mountain is a  mountain summit located in Park County, Wyoming, United States.

Description 
The peak is situated approximately one mile southwest of the town of Cooke City, Montana, just outside the northeast corner of Yellowstone National Park. It is part of the Absaroka Range, and is within the North Absaroka Wilderness, on land managed by Shoshone National Forest. The nearest higher neighbor is Amphitheater Mountain, 2.5 miles to the southwest, and Pilot Peak is four miles to the southeast. The mountain's name was officially adopted as Republic Peak in 1930 by the United States Board on Geographic Names, and officially changed to Republic Mountain by the board in 1959.

Climate 

According to the Köppen climate classification system, Republic Mountain is located in a subarctic climate zone with long, cold, snowy winters, and cool to warm summers. Winter temperatures can drop below −10 °F with wind chill factors below −30 °F. Precipitation runoff from the mountain drains into Republic Creek and Soda Butte Creek, which are tributaries of the Lamar River.

See also
 List of mountain peaks of Wyoming

References

External links
 Weather forecast: Republic Mountain

Mountains of Park County, Wyoming
Mountains of Wyoming
North American 3000 m summits
Shoshone National Forest